Lapointe or LaPoint or Lepoint or LePoint is a surname. Notable people with this surname include;

Lapointe

Singers or artists from Quebec, Canada
 Éric Lapointe (singer) (born 1969), musician
 Jean Lapointe (born 1935), actor, comedian, singer, and politician
 Pierre Lapointe (born 1981), singer-songwriter
 Stéphanie Lapointe (born 1984), singer, song writer, and actress
 Suzanne Lapointe (1934–2015) (1934–2015), singer and actress

Politicians from Quebec, Canada
 Ernest Lapointe (1876–1941), lawyer and politician
 François Lapointe (politician) (born 1971), politician
 Linda Lapointe (born 1960), business woman and politician
 Lisette Lapointe (born 1943), politician, journalist and teacher,
 Renaude Lapointe (1912–2002), journalist and politician

Other people named Lapointe
 Boby Lapointe (1922–1972), French singer
 Claude Lapointe (born 1968), NHL player for the New York Islanders
 Éric Lapointe (Canadian football) (born 1974): Football player for the Montreal Alouettes
 François Lapointe (racewalker) (born 1961), Canadian racewalker
 Guy Lapointe (born 1948), NHL player for the Montreal Canadiens
 Martin Lapointe (born 1973), NHL hockey player for the Ottawa Senators
 Ralph LaPointe (1922–1967), American baseball player
 Rick Lapointe (1955–1999), NHL player
 Ron Lapointe (1949–1992), professional ice hockey coach, Quebec Nordiques 1987–1989
 Ron LaPointe (American football), American football player, 1980–1981

LaPoint
Bob LaPoint (born 1955), American water skier
Dave LaPoint (born 1959), American baseball pitcher
Kris LaPoint (born 1953), American water skier

Lepoint
Christophe Lepoint (born 1984), Belgian soccer player

LePoint
 Olympia LePoint (born 1976), American author

See also
Dufour-Lapointe, a surname
Lapointe (disambiguation)